SheWired was an online magazine and special interest website based in Los Angeles, California. Launched by LGBT media company Here Media in 2008, the magazine primarily focused on lesbian culture.

History

Notes

References

External links 
 

2008 establishments in California
LGBT-related magazines published in the United States
Online magazines published in the United States
Lesbian culture in California
Lesbian-related mass media in the United States
Lesbian-related websites
Magazines established in 2008
Magazines published in California